The delectable soft-furred mouse or East African praomys (Montemys delectorum) is a species of rodent in the family Muridae. It is the only member of the genus Montemys; it was formerly classified in the genus Praomys.

It is found in Kenya, Malawi, Mozambique, Tanzania, and Zambia.
Its natural habitat is subtropical or tropical moist montane forests.
It is threatened by habitat loss.

References

Old World rats and mice
Mammals described in 1910
Taxa named by Oldfield Thomas
Taxonomy articles created by Polbot
Taxobox binomials not recognized by IUCN